The PP Mi-D mine is a Czechoslovakian copy of the German Second World War Schu-mine 42 anti-personnel mine.

It consists of a simple wooden box with a hinged lid that acts as the trigger mechanism. A slot is cut into the side of the lid which rests on the striker retaining pin. The main charge is a block of cast TNT into which a variety of fuzes may be placed, typically either the RO-1 or an MUV series fuze.

The mine is triggered by pressure on the lid forcing the retaining pin out of the striker which then hits the detonator. It can be used with a tripwire connected to the fuze acting as a crude anti-handling device.

There are also sometimes two holes drilled in the front of the box that accept wooden pins, either to prevent accidental detonation when laying or to increase the operating pressure.

The wooden construction of the mine results in a short field life, with the box rotting or splitting preventing the mine from functioning.

Specifications
 Height:
 With fuze: 72 mm
 Without fuze: 59 mm
 Width: 102 mm
 Length: 136 mm
 Weight: 500 g
 Explosive content: 200 g of TNT
 Sensitivity: 1 to 10 kg

Users
The mine was deployed in Angola and Namibia during the 1970s and 1980s.

References
 Clear Path International

Anti-personnel mines
Land mines of Czechoslovakia